The men's 660 yards was one of seven track cycling events on the Cycling at the 1908 Summer Olympics programme. It was the shortest of the events. The 1908 Games was the only time when the 660 yards event was part of the Olympic cycling program. Each nation could enter a maximum of 12 cyclists.

Competition format

The 660 yards race was a sprint-style race that consisted of a single lap around the track. The time limit for the race was 1 minute, 10 seconds. The competition was conducted in three rounds (heats, semifinals, and a final). The first round featured 16 heats, with up to 4 cyclists each. The winning cyclist advanced to the semifinals, provided that the time limit was not exceeded. The semifinal round comprised 4 semifinals, each with 4 cyclists except that 1 was reduced to 3 cyclists because one of the heats had resulted in no winner under the time limit. Again, the winning cyclist in each semifinal advanced to the final.

Results

First round

One cyclist from each of the 16 heats advanced to the semifinal round.

Heat 1

Heat 2

Heat 3

Heat 4

Heat 5

The fifth heat was voided due to the two cyclists both exceeding the time limit of 70 seconds.

Heat 6

Heat 7

Heat 8

Heat 9

Heat 10

Heat 11

Heat 12

Heat 13

Heat 14

Heat 15

Heat 16

Semifinals

The fastest cyclist in each of the 4 semifinals advanced to the final.

Semifinal 1

Semifinal 2

Semifinal 3

Semifinal 4

Final

References

Sources
 
 De Wael, Herman. Herman's Full Olympians: "Cycling 1908". Accessed 7 April 2006.

Men's 000660 yards
Track cycling at the 1908 Summer Olympics
Olympic track cycling events